The 6 Hours of Monza (formerly the 1000 Kilometres of Monza and known after 1966 as the Trofeo Filippo Caracciolo) is an endurance race, mainly for sports cars, which is held at the Autodromo Nazionale di Monza in Italy.

Overview
Despite its title, the race has been run at shorter lengths (most notably in the late 1970s and early 1990s, before the demise of the World Sportscar Championship in 1992). The Coppa Intereuropa was first held in 1949 on a  circuit. The race length was expanded to 1,000 km in 1954; in 1956, it was held on a  circuit. The race was shortened and returned to the 6.3-km track the following year. In 1960 and 1961, it was part of the FIA GT Cup.

In 1963, the race was held as a three-hour event for production-based cars in the World Sportscar Championship before its expansion to 1,000 km in 1965. Until 1969, the full Monza circuit (including the banked oval) was used. To slow the cars, chicanes were installed in 1965 at the beginning of the second bank (the south curve) and in 1966 at the beginning of the other bank. From 1970, the shorter  Grand Prix circuit has been used occasionally.

History
 1976 - The World Sportscar Championship was split into two series. The first, for production-based cars, was called the World Championship for Makes. The second, for prototype cars, was called the World Sports car Championship. The Monza race was eligible for the latter in 1976 and 1977.
 1978 - The World Sports Car Championship was cancelled and the race was reconfigured for 320 km, making it eligible for the European Sportscar Championship.
 1979 - After the European Championship was cancelled, the race was eligible for the Italian championship.
 1980 - The race again became eligible for the World Sportscar Championship.
 1989 - It was cancelled due to financial problems with the Automobile Club of Milan and for the rebuilding of boxes and paddock facilities.
 1992 - The race was used on and off by various series, including the BPR Global GT Series, the Italian GT Championship, and the Challenge Endurance Italia series in 1997 and 1998. The FIA Sportscar Championship hosted the 1,000 km in 2001.
 1995 and 1996 - The race was valid for the BPR Global GT Series, reserved for GT cars with the four-hour format.
 1998 - Did not qualify for an international championship. It returned to the 1,000-kilometre distance, and was re-opened to sports cars.
 1999 - The distance was reduced to 500 km, and it again became eligible for the international SportsRacing World Cup championship.
 2000 - Although the race was run at 500 km, it was called "1,000 km" because another 500-km race (for the FIA GT Championship) was held that morning.
 2001 - Returning to the 1,000-kilometre distance, the race was eligible for the FIA Sportscar Championship. 
 2003 - After a year off, the race returned to the 500-kilometre distance.
 2004 - the race was resumed as part of the Le Mans Series. 
 2006 - The race, part of the Le Mans Series, was cancelled due to protests about noise pollution. 
 2007 - Agreements were reached to allow the event to return to the Le Mans Series.

The race was not held from 2009 to 2020, after which a six-hour race was scheduled as part of the 2021 FIA World Endurance Championship.

Winners

Notes

References

External links

 Racing Sports Cars: Monza archive

 
1949 establishments in Italy
Recurring sporting events established in 1949
Auto races in Italy
Sports car races